The Reserve Bank of Dallas Houston Branch is one of three branches of the Federal Reserve Bank of Dallas.
The branch is located on Allen Parkway in the Fourth Ward of Houston, Texas. The  building, which includes the second largest currency vault in the country, was designed by architect Michael Graves.

Structure
The building's architect Michael Graves said the inspiration for the structure was the Southwestern landscape. Musician and Talking Heads leader David Byrne, commented that "This very out of place structure somehow lingers, like a fart left by someone no longer in an elevator." The brick exterior, which consists of 537,000 closure brick, 31,400 blue structural glazed tile, and 90,000 modular accent brick has been called a masonry masterpiece by the Mason Contractors Association of America.

Board of Directors

The following people are on the board of directors as of 2013:

Appointed by the Federal Reserve Bank

Appointed by the Board of Governors

See also

 Federal Reserve Act
 Federal Reserve System
 Federal Reserve Bank
 Federal Reserve Districts
 Federal Reserve Branches
 Structure of the Federal Reserve System
 Federal Reserve Bank of Dallas
 Federal Reserve Bank of Dallas El Paso Branch
 Federal Reserve Bank of Dallas San Antonio Branch

References

Federal Reserve branches
Michael Graves buildings
Buildings of the United States government in Texas
Fourth Ward, Houston
Buildings and structures in Houston
New Classical architecture